The economic history of Azerbaijan is a historical review of the development of the Azerbaijani economy from the beginning of the 20th century to the modern economy of the Republic of Azerbaijan.

The economy of Azerbaijan in the period of Azerbaijan Democratic Republic 

The government of the Democratic Republic of Azerbaijan did a lot of work from 1918 to 1920 to restore the Azerbaijani economy, which faced a decline following the overthrow of tsarism.

In 1919 the State Budget of Azerbaijan amounted to 665 million manats. The bulk of it was replenished by selling oil and levying profit tax, which was 30% then. Other sources of fiscal revenues were excise taxes on the sale of wine, tobacco and oil.

The custom services, established in those years, contributed 100 million manats to the treasury. 15 million manats came from duties levied on free trade, freight and passenger transportation. In those years Azerbaijan was a more agrarian country, aimed mainly at animal husbandry. During this period the cattle reached 1 million heads, horses – 150 thousand heads, buffaloes – 300 thousand heads, camels – 12 thousand head, rams and goats 1.5 million heads. Bartering was common in trade and economic relations of the Republic: oil was given in exchange for imported goods.

Azerbaijan was paying for military goods, telephone sets, cars, 100 locomotives, 2 thousand tanks, 5 thousand closed wagons, food products of America, France, Italy and other countries mainly with oil, cotton, wool, silk and leather.

The export of Azerbaijani oil declined significantly following the revolution in Russia. Because of the closure of the northern market in 1919 only 600 thousand tons of oil were exported from the 3.6 million tons of oil produced. Exporting oil to Europe became possible only after the restoration of the Baku-Batumi oil pipeline in 1919 and construction of the Baku-Julfa railway.

In the years 1918-1920 the Democratic Republic of Azerbaijan made some changes in the administrative-territorial structure of the country and reorganized financial affairs of the country.

Within the Soviet Union 

The shaping of economic structure of the country continued at a slow pace during 1920-1939. The primary economic sectors were oil, gas, chemical, light industries, food processing, machine building and metalworking.

In the first years after the Second World War, all the branches of the economy were adjusted to the requirements of the peacetime period. In 1948, the republic's industry produced more goods than in the prewar years. In 1950, the production of industrial goods increased by 39% compared to 1940. In the 1950s and 1960s, the development of Azerbaijan industry was intensified, regional and sectoral structures had been improved. The output of industrial goods increased by 5.5 times in comparison with 1940. 146 large industrial facilities, which amounted to 60% of all constructions, were built and put into production in the years between 1941 and 1970s. Major factories such as the plant for the production of pipes, aluminum and rubber synthesis in Sumqayit, the Ganja aluminum smelter, the Dashkesen ore purification plant, the Mingechaur hydroelectric power station, etc., were built and put into production for the Azerbaijani industry. Thereby the foundation was laid for the development of such industries as heavy industry, energy, chemistry, petrochemistry, oil refining, ferrous and non-ferrous metallurgy, instrument making and electrical engineering.

During these years, a lot of work was done in the direction of profitable placement of industrial sectors and facilities in the country, developing of the regions with a low standard of living, increasing the level of use of labor resources in small and medium-sized cities.

Years of Independence 

Since the country's independence in 1991, the Republic of Azerbaijan has embarked on an independent policy in the field of economy. After the dissolution of the Soviet Union, Azerbaijan's economy had been severely damaged. The poverty rate had reached 49% in 2001. Later Azerbaijan's gross national income (GNI) amounted to $7,350 (2013) per capita, GDP per capita to $7,912.5 (2013), and a poverty rate decreased to 5% in 2013.

The exploitation of hydrocarbon resources has played a pivotal role in the economic development of Azerbaijan. The number of agreements with foreign companies and foreign investments had also contributed to the state's economy. Transition to market economy by adopting relevant reforms had also been one of the main objectives of the economic policy.

The first period of the economical development of Azerbaijan (from 1991-1995) can be described as the period of economic recession. The period after 1996 can be portrayed as the period of dynamic economic development.

Azerbaijan had broad-based economic foundations, which had been developing in different directions before 1991. Independence led to economic decline in Azerbaijan. Many factors caused GDP shrinking until 1996. The situation with Armenia aggravated the economic downturn.

In 1994, one of the important oil contracts was signed between Azerbaijan and 13 major oil companies, representing 8 countries of the world. This agreement went down in history as "the Contract of Century".

In the same year, the Presidents of the United States, Turkey, Azerbaijan, Georgia, Kazakhstan and Turkmenistan signed inter-State agreement on the construction of oil export pipeline Baku-Tbilisi-Ceyhan.

A contract was signed in Baku between BP, Statoil, LUKAgip, Elf Aquitaine (France) (now TOTAL), OIEC (Iran) (now NICO), TPAO and SOCAR on the promising structure of Shah Deniz gas condensate field in 1996.

In 1999, the Baku-Supsa oil pipeline was put into operation. The pipeline was built as part of the contract for the development of the Azeri-Chirag-Gunashli fields.Oil-gas sector contributed to the flourishing of other fields of economy. New reforms and measures were taken to reach macroeconomic and financial stability. During those years, Azerbaijan had joined different international institutions (IMF, World Bank, EBRD, Islam Development Bank, Asian Development Bank). The poverty rate had been decreased from 68% in 1995 to 29% in 2005 due to the economic growth.

In 2005, the government decided to revalue the manat at the rate of 5,000 to 1 new manat (AZN).  In 2005–2010 years average annual growth rates of "oil" GDP more than 3.5 times higher than the increase in "non-oil" GDP. The share of the oil sector in the country's GDP for this period rose from 39 to 60%. Bank loans and incentive measures of the government contributed to the rapid growth of non-oil industries. Significant growth in the construction industry and service sector led to the fact that in 2010, the non-oil sector of Azerbaijan's economy overtook the oil industry in terms of growth rates.

3 five-year programs related to the socio-economic development of the Republic of Azerbaijan were implemented during 2004-2013. These programs were aimed at economic diversification. "State Programs for Social and Economic Development for 2014-2018", "State Programs on Poverty Reduction and Sustainable Development in the Republic of Azerbaijan for 2008-2015", "State Programs for reliable food supply of the population of the Republic of Azerbaijan for 2008-2015" and a number of sectoral development programs were implemented to date.

A number of socioeconomic region development programs aimed at economic diversification were implemented between 2004 and 2018.

The estimates of the Davos World Economic Forum showed that Azerbaijan's economy ranked 38th in the world for the level of competitiveness.

See also 
 The Azerbaijan Economy
 History of Azerbaijan

References

External links 
 Economic Development in Azerbaijan